Benjamin Wold is currently Professor of Ancient Judaism and Christianity at Trinity College, Dublin, School of Religion (Faculty of Arts, Humanities, and Social Sciences).

Publications
 Women, Men and Angels: Allusions to Genesis Creation Traditions in Musar leMevin (Tübingen: Mohr Siebeck, 2005). See 4QInstruction
 4QInstruction: Divisions and Hierarchies (STDJ 123; Leiden: Brill, 2018)
 (ed.) Memory and Remembrance in the Bible and Antiquity (Tübingen: Mohr Siebeck, 2007), with Loren Stuckenbruck and Stephen Barton.
 (ed.) Das Böse, der Teufel und Dämonen - Evil, the Devil and Demons (Tübingen: Mohr Siebeck, 2015), with Jan Dochhorn and Susanne Rudnig-Zelt.

References

External links
Faculty Profile
 Author Profile

Living people
Academics of Trinity College Dublin
1974 births